The 2016–17 Aris Thessaloniki B.C. season was the 63rd appearance in the top-tier level Greek Basket League for Aris Thessaloniki. The team also competed in the Greek Basketball Cup, where they lost in the final from Panathinaikos Superfoods in Alexandreio Melathron Nick Galis Hall, and in the Basketball Champions League.

Overview

Roster

Roster changes

In

Out

Competitions

Greek Basket League

Regular season

Standings

Matches

Results overview

Playoffs

Quarterfinals

Semifinals

Third Place

Greek Cup

Quarterfinal

Semifinal

Final

Champions League

Regular season

League table

Matches

Results overview

Play-offs qualifiers

Round of 16

Statistics

Basket League

Regular season

Shooting

Last updated: 13 April 2017
Source: ESAKE

Playoffs

Shooting

Last updated: 31 May 2017
Source: ESAKE

Champions League

Shooting

Last updated: 7 March 2017
Source: BCL

References

Aris B.C. seasons